The São Tomé prinia (Prinia molleri) is a species of bird in the family Cisticolidae. It is endemic to São Tomé and Príncipe and is found in the island of São Tomé. Its natural habitats are subtropical or tropical moist montane forest and subtropical or tropical moist shrubland. The species was named by José Vicente Barbosa du Bocage in 1887.

References

São Tomé prinia
Endemic birds of São Tomé and Príncipe
Endemic fauna of São Tomé Island
São Tomé prinia
Taxonomy articles created by Polbot